Mervyn McKinnon (9 July 1931 – 28 August 2001) was a New Zealand field hockey player. He competed in the men's tournament at the 1960 Summer Olympics.

References

External links
 

1931 births
2001 deaths
New Zealand male field hockey players
Olympic field hockey players of New Zealand
Field hockey players at the 1960 Summer Olympics
Sportspeople from Christchurch